Vasil Levski Boulevard is a major boulevard in Sofia, the capital of Bulgaria. It lies between the Freight Station Square at the Slivnitsa and Danail Nikolaev Boulevards and the area of the National Palace of Culture. It is named after Bulgaria's national hero Vasil Levski. 

Some of the most prominent landmarks of the capital are situated along the boulevard, including the National Academy of Arts, SS. Cyril and Methodius National Library, Sofia University, the State Agency of Youth and Sports, Battenberg Mausoleum, the Monument to Vasil Levski and others.

Vasil Levski Boulevard crosses many of the city's vital transport arteries, such as Georgi Rakovski Street, Tsar Osvoboditel Boulevard at Sofia University, Patriarch Evtimiy Boulevard and Graf Ignatiev Street at Patriarch Evtimiy Square.

The boulevard is served by many public bus and trolley bus lines and also SU St. Kliment Ohridski Metro Station.

Gallery 

Streets in Sofia